Koran Jakarta (The Jakarta Paper) is a daily newspaper published in Jakarta, Indonesia. Published by PT Berita Nusantara, the paper has an illustration of the iconic Hermes statue (which it was, and currently a replica is, located in Harmoni, Central Jakarta and moved off the Jakarta History Museum) in its nameplate.

Koran Jakarta was started publication on April 28, 2008 in The Sultan Hotel, Central Jakarta. Despite its name, the paper calls itself a national newspaper with news coverage and targeted market within and outside the city. At the initial years, Koran Jakarta was known for its newspaper vending machines (called Anjungan Koran Mandiri or AKM), which was the only one in Indonesia, located in several places such as in Soekarno–Hatta International Airport.

Koran Jakarta does not published a Sunday edition, instead the Saturday edition is titled Koran Jakarta Weekend.

References

External links 
 Official website

Newspapers published in Jakarta
Newspapers established in 2008
2008 establishments in Indonesia